Enes is a Turkish male given name. People named Enes include:
 Enes Batur (born 1998), the first Turkish YouTuber to reach 10 million subscribers
 Enes Bešić (born 1963), Bosnian footballer
 Enes Demirović (born 1972), Bosnian footballer
 Enes Erkan (born 1987), Turkish karateka
 Enes Fermino (born 1987), Swiss footballer
 Enes Kanter Freedom (born 1992), Turkish–American basketball player
 Enes Mešanović (born 1975), Bosnian footballer
 Enes Novinić (born 1985), Croatian footballer
 Enes Özdemir (born 2002), Turkish karateka
 Enes Rujovič (born 1989), Slovenian footballer
 Enes Sağlık (born 1991), Belgian-Turkish footballer
 Enes Uğurlu (born 1989), Turkish archer
 Enes Ünal (born 1997), Turkish footballer 
 Enes Meral (born 2000), Turkish-German rapper

See also
Enos (disambiguation), includes list of people with given name Enos

Bosnian masculine given names
Turkish masculine given names